Tony O'Neill (born in 1978, Blackburn, Lancashire) is an English writer based in New York. A one-time musician with Kenickie (1997–98), Marc Almond (1997–98), The Brian Jonestown Massacre (1999), and Kelli Ali (2001–04), O'Neill is also the author of several books including Digging the Vein (2006), Down and Out on Murder Mile (2008) and Sick City (2010).

Literary career

Digging the Vein was a novel based on O'Neill's years as a heroin and crack addict as well as his experiences in the music industry, while the sequel, Down and Out on Murder Mile was released by Harper Perennial as a mass market paperback in November 2008.  

Sick City was released by Harper Perennial in July 2010.  The plot revolves around two heroin addicts who try to sell a legendary sex tape starring Sharon Tate.  The book earned praise from Barry Gifford, Sebastian Horsley, and Tom McCarthy among others.  In 2012 the novel was optioned for the screen by screenwriter Jayson Rothwell.

A sequel to Sick City, Black Neon was published by Walde and Graf in German in August 2012.  It follows the further adventures of Sick Citys protagonists Randal and Jeffrey, and their adventures in the world of Santaria, art-house cinema, and their run-ins with a pair of lesbian pharmacy bandits.

He also co-wrote the memoirs of NFL player Jason Peter.  The resulting book, Hero of the Underground, was a New York Times bestseller published in July 2008 by St Martins Press.  Other non-fiction works include the memoir of the lead singer of The Runaways, Cherie Currie – Neon Angel: A Memoir of The Runaways (2010, It Books / Harper Collins).

A short story anthology, Notre Dame Du Vide, was published in France, June 2009, by 13e Note Editions. Down and Out on Murder Mile and Sick City have also been translated into French, and Sick City was scheduled to be published in Germany, Switzerland, and Austria in 2011.

He has written short stories for 3:AM Magazine and Laura Hird's fiction showcase, among others.  A short story collection, Seizure Wet Dreams, was published by Social Disease in the UK, also in 2006. In 2007 Songs From The Shooting Gallery, his first book of poetry was published by Burning Shore Press of Long Beach, California. His short story "Fragments of Joe" was featured in The Heroin Chronicles ed. Jerry Stahl, on Akashic Books.

He is a founding member of the Brutalists, a literary collective including authors Adelle Stripe and Ben Myers.

Works

Fiction
Digging The Vein (2006)
Down and Out on Murder Mile (2008)
Sick City (2010)
Black Neon (2012)
La Vie Sauvage / The Savage Life (2016)

Short fiction
Seizure Wet Dreams Social Disease (2006)
Notre Dame du Vide 13eNote Editions Paris (2009)
The Loose Canon Vol. 1 Siren Song, Montreal (2009), 
The Heroin Chronicles Akashic Books (2012)
Dirty Hits: Stories 2005-2015 Vicon Editions (2015)

Poetry
Songs from the Shooting Gallery (2007)

Non-fiction
Hero of the Underground (2008), co-writer with Jason Peter
Neon Angel: A Memoir of The Runaways (2010), co-writer with Cherie Currie

External links

3:AM interview
Interview with Tony O'Neill
Interview with Tony O'Neill in Exberliner Magazine

1978 births
Living people
21st-century British novelists
21st-century British short story writers
21st-century English male writers
English expatriates in the United States
English male novelists
English male short story writers
English people of Irish descent
English short story writers